Emeterio de la Garza Jr. (5 April 1873 – 1928) was a Mexican conservative politician and businessman who served as a federal congressman in the Chamber of Deputies and as Special Representative of President Victoriano Huerta in Washington, D.C.

Biography
He was born on 5 April 1873.

Huerta — the army general who assumed control of the country following a coup d'état against the democratically elected president, Francisco I. Madero— tried to avoid a military intervention by the United States in 1913, so he sent De la Garza to negotiate with business leaders and the Wilson administration.

Emeterio was a close friend of businessman James E. Hyslop, he worked as his personal lawyer for several years.

Aside from his political and diplomatic duties, De la Garza edited La Patria newspaper, served as president of the New York, Mobile and Mexico Steamship Line and was a shareholder of the International Bank and Trust Company of Mexico City.

He died in 1928.

Works
 (1902).
 (1914).Mexico and the War: A Lecture by Emeterio de la Garza (1917).'' (1928).

References

External links

1873 births
1928 deaths
People from Marín, Nuevo León
Businesspeople from Nuevo León
Politicians from Nuevo León
Mexican diplomats
Members of the Chamber of Deputies (Mexico)